Pamantasan ng Lungsod ng Valenzuela, also referred to by its acronym PLV is a local government unit-owned public university located in Valenzuela City, Metro Manila, Philippines. PLV is a member of the Association of Local Colleges and Universities.

The Council of Valenzuela approved Ordinance No. 14 on June 5, 2002, which paved way for the establishment of PLV. The city-funded institution of higher learning offers undergraduate and graduate degree programs to students of the city.

Started as an initiative by high school principals in Valenzuela, the Pamantasan ng Lungsod ng Valenzuela was initially located at a government building within the vicinity of the old municipal complex of Valenzuela. In 2008, the city government bought a parcel of land near Children of Mary Immaculate College.

In 2016, the city government of Valenzuela implemented a full subsidy on tuition and miscellaneous fees in PLV and Valenzuela City Polytechnic College (ValPoly).

The city government inaugurated a new PLV campus located along Tongco Street in Barangay Maysan, Valenzuela in 2018.

History
A study group was formed in July 2001 in response to the increasing need for an affordable, accessible and reputable institution of higher learning in the city. 
 
The Study Group was initially composed of Dr. Jose R. Vergara, then Acting Division Superintendent Dr. Andres M. Leabres, City Administrator Atty. Carmelita D. Lozada, Mr. Edison M. Nalo, Executive Director of Valenzuela Polytechnic College and Mr. Erlindo C. Dionisio and Atty. Antonio M. Dalag, the Vice-president and President of the Pamantasan ng Lungsod ng Valenzuela. 
 
This group was later joined by the principals of public and secondary schools in the city, namely Dr. Edgardo A. Abendan of Malinta National High School, Ms. Maxima G. Carlos of Maysan National High School, Ms. Salvacion V. David of Polo National High School, Ms. Bernardina G. Echaluce of Karuhatan National High School, Dr. Erlinda L. Evangelista of VNHS Parada Annex, Ms. Marina Fabian of Canumay National High School, Ms. Amelita S.P. Madarang of Marulas National High School, Dr. Margarito M. Materum of Dalandanan National High School, Ms. Conchita J. Rivero of Lawang Bato National High School, Mr. Efren H. Tanfelix of Gen. T. De Leon National High School

The university formally opened its doors to 500 students on June 24, 2002. When former Mayor Sherwin Gatchalian assumed office in 2004, more plans were focused on education. A new phase of development started under the presidency of Dr. Nedeña C. Torralba. Additional programs added were Graduate Studies in Education and Public Administration, and Certificate in Teaching Program. Facilities and services for students were also developed.

In accordance with City Council Resolution No. 194 Series of 2008, an annex building was built at Maysan Road, Malinta for the surge in the number of qualified enrollees.

The city government implemented a full tuition fee subsidy and miscellaneous fees, including the school ID, library fee, medical fee, newsletter, handbook, laboratory fee, sports fee, multimedia fee and guidance and counseling fee in September 2016.

In 2018, a new PLV campus officially opened situated at the bosom of the City. The 1.7-hectare modern campus consists of three Western Mediterrean-inspired buildings with hi-tech amenities such as engineering and Information and Communication Technology laboratories, a spacious library, and an audio-visual room.

University

The university is divided into several colleges administered by two college deans. Most of the departments are offering undergraduate and graduate degrees. Each department is headed by a coordinator.
 
ACADEMIC TRACKS OFFERED:
 Bachelor of Science in Electrical Engineering
 Bachelor of Science in Civil Engineering
 Bachelor of Science in Information Technology
 Bachelor of Science in Accountancy
 Bachelor of Science in Accounting Technology
 Bachelor of Science in Business Administration Major in Financial Management
 Bachelor of Science in Business Administration Major in Marketing Management
 Bachelor of Science in Business Administration Major in Human Resource Development Management
 Bachelor of Science in Public Administration
 Bachelor of Science in Psychology
 Bachelor of Science in Social Work
 Bachelor of Elementary Education Major in Pre-School Education
 Bachelor of Secondary Education Major in English
 Bachelor of Secondary Education Major in Filipino
 Bachelor of Secondary Education Major in Mathematics
 Bachelor of Secondary Education Major in General Science
 Bachelor of Secondary Education Major in Social Studies

More facilities were constructed and enhanced like the Engineering and Computer Laboratory, University Library, Auditorium, Classrooms, Student Lounge, etc. as part of the Valenzuela City Government's commitment to meet the demand of Valenzuelano high school graduates for a tertiary institution.

Launched alongside the new campus in 2018 is the PLV World card. The RFID-enabled cards serve as their access to enter the campus. Parents or guardians are notified through a text message whether the student went in and out of the campus once they tap the cards. Aside from that, the card is also the students access to online university records, class schedules, and university advisories.

Special programs
 Certificate in Teaching Program (CTP)
 Licensure Examination for Teachers (LET) review classes
 Summer talent workshops

References

Local colleges and universities in Metro Manila
Education in Valenzuela, Metro Manila
Educational institutions established in 2002
2002 establishments in the Philippines